Morven is a historic home located near Markham, Fauquier County, Virginia. The house consists of four one-to-two story, three-bay, gable-roofed houses dating from the late-18th to mid-19th centuries and in the Federal style. The houses were sequentially built in log, frame and stone at right angles of each other. The house is in a cross plan, with an open courtyard in the middle.   Also on the property are the contributing meat house and stone summer kitchen (c. 1820).

It was listed on the National Register of Historic Places in 2002.

References

Houses on the National Register of Historic Places in Virginia
Federal architecture in Virginia
Houses completed in 1820
Houses in Fauquier County, Virginia
National Register of Historic Places in Fauquier County, Virginia